Started in 2008, the Singapore River Festival is a week-long festival in Singapore that features performances and parades in Clarke Quay, Boat Quay, Empress Place and Robertson Quay along the Singapore River.

The 2009 event featured local magicians J C Sum and Magic Babe Ning performing illusions along the river. There was also a series of outdoor parties featuring international DJs Audi Misdemeanor and DJ Jon White.

References

2008 establishments in Singapore
Festivals in Singapore
Singapore River
Music festivals established in 2008
Electronic music festivals in Singapore